Mbere is a municipality of Djibloho, Equatorial Guinea.

References 

Populated places in Djibloho